The women's long jump event at the 2007 Pan American Games was held on July 25.

Results

References
Official results

Long
2007
2007 in women's athletics